Coelioxys elongata  is a Palearctic species of sharp-tailed bee.

References

External links
Images representing  Coelioxys elongata

Hymenoptera of Europe
Megachilidae
Insects described in 1841
Taxa named by Amédée Louis Michel le Peletier